Sir Henry Stewart Cunningham KCIE (1832–1920) was a British lawyer and writer who served as the Advocate-General of Madras Presidency from 1872 to 1877.

Early life and education 
Cunningham was born in 1832 to Rev. John William Cunningham who was the Vicar of Harrow. Cunningham was educated at Harrow and graduated in law from the Trinity College, Oxford. He was called to the bar in 1859.

Career 
Cunningham practised in the United Kingdom and in British India and rose to become Advocate-General of the Madras Presidency in 1872. In 1877, he was appointed judge of the Calcutta High Court and served from 1877 to 1887. In 1878, he was appointed member of the Indian Famine Commission to look into the causes of the Great Famine of 1876–78.

Death 
He was made a Knight Commander of the Order of the Indian Empire on 1 January 1889. Cunningham died in 1920.

Works 
The Chronicles of Dustypore, a Tale of Modern Anglo-Indian Society, Volume 1 
The Chronicles of Dustypore, a Tale of Modern Anglo-Indian Society, Volume 2 
The Heriots 
Wheat and Tares 
Earl Canning 
Late Laurels

References

Further reading

External links 

 
 

1832 births
1920 deaths
People educated at Harrow School
Madras Presidency
Knights Commander of the Order of the Indian Empire
Advocates General for Tamil Nadu
Alumni of Trinity College, Oxford